Masood Ahmed Khan (June 1918–date of death unknown) was a Pakistani field hockey player. He competed in the 1948 Summer Olympics.

References

External links
 

1918 births
Year of death missing
Field hockey players at the 1948 Summer Olympics
Pakistani male field hockey players
Olympic field hockey players of Pakistan
Field hockey players from Amritsar
Indian emigrants to Pakistan